Motala is a township, or tehsil, in the Buldhana district in the Indian state of Maharashtra. One of its villages, Thal, is said to be the birthplace of Gajanan Maharaj. Motala market is a centre of economic activity, partially due to the good communication links between the villages. Villages in Motala taluka include Jaipur, Buldhana Korhala, kharbadi, Kothali, Dhamangaon Badhe, Rohinkhed, Shelapur, Takarkhed and Rajur.

Irrigation 
An earth-fill dam on the Nalganga River provides water for irrigation.

Education
Motala has educational facilities from preschool to graduation level. Tertiary educational institutions include:

Shri Shivaji Arts, Commerce & Science College, Motala
Late Babanrao Deshpande School & Jr. College, Motala
Jawahar Urdu High School & Jr. College, Motala
The Motala Defence Academy

Administration
Motala Nagarpanchayat is responsible for citizen services and some administrative matters in Motala city. It has an administrative as well as technical (engineering) wing for performing operational and developmental activities.

Geography
Motala tehsil is a part of Malkapur, which is a sub-division of the Buldhana district, along with Nandura and Malkapur tehsils. Villages in the tehsil are Chinchpur, Kharbadi, Jaipur, Buldhana, Kothari, Taroda, Tighra, Advihir, Varud, Didola, Sholapur, Talani, Makodi, Pimpri Gawali, Dabhadi, Talked, Borakhedi, Vadgaon, Sarola Pir, Sarola, Maroti, Pophali, Parada, Chinchkhed Nath, Nalkund, Gulbheli, Shirva, Rohinkhed, Dhamangaon Badhe, Vaghjals, Shelgaon Bazar, Sawargaon Jahangir, Ava Yunus our, Liha bk, Talni, Jahagirpur, Makoli, Antri, Kohala Bazar and Pimpalgaon Devi.

Economy 
Motala is economically and educationally poor.

Notables 
Social activists like Vaibhav Jaware were born in Motala.

Missions like Mission Madat and Mission Tahan originated in Village of Antri of Motala Taluka.

Climate 
The average rainfall of this region is about 692 mm.
The maximum temperature during summers is 48 °C.
The minimum temperature during winters is 13 °C.

References

Talukas in Maharashtra